is the title of two different greatest hits albums by Japanese idol duo Pink Lady, released through Victor Entertainment in 1977 and 1978.

1977 version

Released on December 5, 1977, this album features the duo's singles from "Pepper Keibu" to "UFO", as well as their accompanying B-side songs. This version was reissued in a two-CD compilation on June 4, 2003, with the second disc featuring the duo's singles from "UFO" to "OH!".

The album became the duo's second No. 1 on Oricon's weekly albums chart. It sold over 702,000 copies, becoming the duo's biggest-selling album. The 2003 CD release peaked at No. 95 and sold an additional 4,000 copies.

Track listing 
All lyrics are written by Yū Aku; all music is composed and arranged by Shunichi Tokura, except where indicated.

Charts

1978 version

The second version of the compilation album was released on December 5, 1978, focusing mainly on the duo's singles up to "Chameleon Army", as well as four later B-side songs.

The album peaked at No. 3 on Oricon's weekly albums chart and sold over 159,000 copies.

Track listing

Charts

References

External links
 
 
 

1977 greatest hits albums
1978 greatest hits albums
Pink Lady (band) compilation albums
Japanese-language compilation albums
Victor Entertainment compilation albums